Dewan Devdi was the palace of the nobles, the Salar Jungs. It was situated close to Charminar and Chowmahalla Palace in Hyderabad. The word Diwan means Prime Minister, and Devdi refers to mansions of Hyderabadi noblemen.

Dewan Devdi has some 78 rooms in it. It had different buildings like Aina Khana, Lakkad Kotha, Chini Khana, Nizam Bagh and Noor Mahal, which no more exist. The gateway to the palace still exists.

There were five people from the family, who served as Prime Ministers of the Hyderabad state, the proximity of Dewan Devdi to the Nizams was important.

Dewan Devdi also housed the Salar Jung Museum. The museum was inaugurated on 16 December 1951 by Jawaharlal Nehru and its priceless collection was housed in this 100-year-old palace, a private collection of the Salar Jungs, before it moved to its present location.

References

External links
A picture of Dewan Devdi

Heritage structures in Hyderabad, India